T-ara's Best of Best 2009-2012: Korean ver. (stylized as T-ARA's Best of Best 2009-2012 ～KOREAN ver.～) is the first greatest hits album by South Korean girl group T-ara. It was released on October 10, 2012 by EMI Music Japan to commemorate the one-year anniversary of the group's Japanese debut. The album contains all of T-ara's singles from Absolute First Album (2009) up to Funky Town (2012), including their 2010 FIFA World Cup digital single "We Are the One". A limited ultra-deluxe edition of the album, which includes a 72-page photobook and 120-minute documentary of T-ara's "Free Time in Europe" trip, was released on October 17, 2012.

Track listing

Charts

Oricon

Release history

References

2012 greatest hits albums
T-ara albums
EMI Records compilation albums